Theobald Stapleton, alias Teabóid Gálldubh (1589 – 13 September 1647), was an Irish Roman Catholic priest born in County Tipperary, Ireland. Little is known of his career, except that he was a priest living in Flanders.

Stapleton was responsible for the establishment of the Irish College in Seville in 1612 and the Irish College in Madrid in 1629

In 1639, he published a catechism in Early Modern Irish to promote the use of the language in religious literature. It was the first Roman Catholic book in which the Irish language was printed in antiqua type. The book, published in Brussels, was called  or, in Irish, .

Stapleton's catechism was also the first notable attempt to simplify Irish spelling. He advocated and used a simplified spelling of Irish to encourage literacy among less educated people. However, only authors of devotional literature adopted his spelling system; the classical spelling system remained in place until the 20th century.

On 27 September 1647, in the Sack of Cashel, during the Irish Confederate Wars Stapleton was captured in the cathedral at Cashel by Parliamentarian soldiers under the command of Murrough O'Brien, 1st Earl of Inchiquin, and put to death on the spot.

Due to his martyrdom in Pope John Paul II venerated him in 1991 and in 1992 beatified him, making him Blessed Theobald Stapleton.

References

Sources and external links
Ryan-Hackett, Rita. 1995. The Stapletons of Drom, alias Font-Forte, Co. Tipperary. Killiney: Thornvale.
Theobald Stapleton at the Catholic Encyclopedia
St. John D. Seymour: The Storming of the Rock of Cashel by Lord Inchiquin in 1647.English Historical Review, Vol. 32, No. 127 (July, 1917)
Araltas.com
Simplified Spelling System
Franciscans in Cashel and Emly
The Spiritual Rose ed. Malachy McKenna

1589 births
1647 deaths
Irish-language writers
17th-century Irish Roman Catholic priests
People from County Kilkenny
People of Elizabethan Ireland
17th-century Roman Catholic martyrs